Evgeny Vladimirovich Chetvergov (Russian cyrillic: Евгений Владимирович Четвергов) alias Nujan Vidjaz (Erzya: Нуянь Видяз) (born Ardatovo, Mordovia, March 30, 1934) is an Erzya writer. He has written several books in Russian and Erzya. He is editor-in-chief of the journal Erzyan Mastor.

Life 
He studied agricultural science and worked as an agricultural engineer and as a professor at the Mordovian State University. He was one of the founders of the cultural club "Mastorava".

Works 
Сиреневая луна (1989)
Велень вайгельть (1992)
Сырнень човалят (1995)
Иень тюст (2003)
Янгамо (2006)
Эрзянь Масторонть седейсэ. Имена их бессмертны (2007)
Где цветет чистодуш? (2009)
Эрязденть арсезь (2010)
Ванине (2011)
Тесэ ды Тосо (2013)
Финно-угры в русском языке: топонимо-этимологический словарь финно-язычных, угорских и селькупских слов, вошедших в лексику русского языка (2015)
Поладкстомо (2016)

References

 
1934 births
Living people
People from Dubyonsky District, Republic of Mordovia
Mordvin people
20th-century Russian writers
21st-century Russian writers 
Russian-language writers
Erzyan-language writers
20th-century Russian engineers
21st-century Russian engineers
Agricultural engineers